Amentotaxus hatuyenensis is a species of conifer in the yew family, Taxaceae. It is endemic to Vietnam.

This is an endangered species with a total population of fewer than 250 mature individuals limited to Hà Giang Province in northern Vietnam. They grow in various types of forest on karst formations. They may be found alongside conifers such as Pinus fenzeliana, Tsuga chinensis, Cephalotaxus mannii, Podocarpus neriifolius, Nageia fleuryi, and Podocarpus pilgeri. There are also many epiphytes such as orchids in the habitat.

References

hatuyenensis
Endangered plants
Endemic flora of Vietnam
Plants described in 1996
Taxonomy articles created by Polbot